Lake Belmore was built in 1995 to supply town water to Croydon in Queensland, Australia.
The waters behind the dam are stocked with barramundi and redclaw crayfish.

See also

List of reservoirs and dams in Australia

References

Dams in Queensland
Dams completed in 1995
North West Queensland
Reservoirs in Queensland
1995 establishments in Australia